Only the Wild Survive is the fourth and final studio album by Wild Cherry, released in 1979. Their fourth studio album, this would be their last before breaking up the same year. It contains the single "Keep On Playin' That Funky Music" a sequel to their 1976 hit "Play That Funky Music". It was also the first and only Wild Cherry album to feature Donnie Iris (formerly of the Jaggerz) as a performer. After Wild Cherry's breakup, Iris and bandmate Mark Avsec would launch Donnie Iris and the Cruisers.

Track listing 
 "Try a Piece of My Love" (James Robert Barrett, Mark Cunningham) - 4:28
 "Look at Her Dance" (Russ Ballard) - 4:40
 "Don't Wait Too Long" (Robert Parissi) - 5:50
 "Starlight" (Parissi) - 4:25
 "Hold On to Your Hiney" (Tony Joe White) - 4:15
 "All Night's All Right" (Dean Parks) - 3:50
 "Raindance" (Billy Burnette, Larry Henley) - 3:26
 "Take Me Back" (Mark Avsec, Parissi) - 4:10
 "Keep On Playin' That Funky Music" (Harrison Calloway, Clarence Jones, Parissi) - 3:55

Personnel 
 Robert Parissi - lead guitar, lead vocals
 Donnie Iris - guitar, vocals
 Mark Avsec - keyboards, vocals
 Cooke Michalchick - bass
 Ron Beitle - drums, vocals

References

1979 albums
Wild Cherry (band) albums
Epic Records albums